The 2017–18 season was fourth consecutive  season in the top Ukrainian football league for Olimpik Donetsk. Olimpik competed in Premier League, Ukrainian Cup.  For the time in history of Olimpik it took part in European club tournament, representing Ukraine in UEFA Europa League during this season.

Players

Squad information

Transfers

In

Out

Pre-season and friendlies

Competitions

Overall

Premier League

League table

Results summary

Results by round

Matches

 Match suspended after 1st half due to adverse weather conditions. 2nd half scheduled for February 21

Ukrainian Cup

UEFA Europa League

Statistics

Appearances and goals

|-
! colspan=14 style=background:#dcdcdc; text-align:center| Goalkeepers

|-
! colspan=14 style=background:#dcdcdc; text-align:center| Defenders

|-
! colspan=14 style=background:#dcdcdc; text-align:center| Midfielders 

|-
! colspan=14 style=background:#dcdcdc; text-align:center| Forwards

|-
! colspan=14 style=background:#dcdcdc; text-align:center| Players transferred out during the season

Last updated: 19 May 2018

Goalscorers

Last updated: 19 May 2018

Clean sheets

Last updated: 19 May 2018

Disciplinary record

Last updated: 19 May 2018

References

External links
 Official website 

Olimpik Donetsk
FC Olimpik Donetsk
Olimpik Donetsk